Clair LaVane Gleason (May 17, 1923 – June 29, 1986) was an American football, basketball, and baseball and track coach and college athletic administrator. He served as the head football coach at Sterling College in Sterling, Kansas for seven seasons, from 1953 to 1959, compiling a record of 29–29. Gleason succeeded Os Doenges as athletic director and coach at Sterling in 1953. He was previously the director of physical education at Miltonvale Wesleyan College in Miltonvale, Kansas.

Gleason died June 29, 1986 at the Hutchinson Hospital in Hutchinson, Kansas.

Head coaching record

Football

References

External links
 

1923 births
1986 deaths
Sterling Warriors athletic directors
Sterling Warriors baseball coaches
Sterling Warriors football coaches
Sterling Warriors men's basketball coaches
College track and field coaches in the United States
People from Jewell County, Kansas